The 1887 MLB Season was the National League's twelfth season and American Association's sixth season. The Detroit Wolverines defeated the  St. Louis Browns in a 15-game World Series match played in ten cities.
The Louisville Colonels set a Major League record which still stands for the most base on balls for a team in a game, with 19 against the Cleveland Blues on 21 September.

Standings

American Association

National League

League leaders
In 1887, bases on balls (walks) were counted as hits by the major leagues in existence at the time. This inflated batting averages, with 11 players batting .400 or better, and the experiment was abandoned the following season. Historical statistics for the season were later revised, such that "Bases on balls shall always be treated as neither a time at bat nor a hit for the batter." This results in ambiguity for some players' season and career hits totals, notably with Cap Anson. Anson was credited with a .421 average and the National League batting title in 1887; however, the recalculation of averages with walks excluded lowered his average to .347 and retroactively gave the batting title to Sam Thompson.

Postseason
World Series:
 The Detroit Wolverines (79–45, NL) defeated the St. Louis Browns (95–40, AA) ten games to five.

References

 
1887